Vitamin D and Omega-3 Trial (VITAL) (VITamin D and OmegA-3 TriaL) is a "randomized clinical trial in 25,871 U.S. men and women investigating whether taking daily dietary supplements of vitamin D3 (2000 IU) or omega-3 fatty acids (Omacor fish oil, 1 gram) reduces the risk of developing cancer, heart disease, and stroke in people who do not have a prior history of these illnesses". Its estimated completion date is November 2018.The  study sponsor and investigators have  responsibility  for its safety and scientific validity. The Sponsor is Brigham and Women's Hospital with collaborators, National Cancer Institute, National Heart, Lung, and Blood Institute, Office of Dietary Supplements, National Institute of Neurological Disorders and Stroke, National Center for Complementary and Integrative Health, Pharmavite LLC, Pronova BioPharma and BASF.

It aims to enroll 20,000 participants (women 55 or over, men 50 or over) who will be randomized to one of four groups:
 daily vitamin D (2000 IU) and fish oil (1 g);
 daily vitamin D and fish-oil placebo;
 daily vitamin-D placebo and fish oil;
 daily vitamin-D placebo and fish-oil placebo.

Participants will answer annual questionnaires to determine effects on risk of cancer, heart disease, stroke, osteoporosis, diabetes, memory loss and depression.

References

Vitamin D
Clinical trials
Geriatrics